Winter sports or winter activities are competitive sports or non-competitive recreational activities which are played on snow or ice. Most are variations of skiing, ice skating and sledding. Traditionally, such games were only played in cold areas during winter, but artificial snow and artificial ice allow more flexibility. Playing areas and fields consist of either snow or ice. 

Artificial ice can be used to provide ice rinks for ice skating, ice hockey, para ice hockey, ringette, broomball, bandy, rink bandy, rinkball, and spongee in a milder climate. The sport of speed skating uses a frozen circular track of ice, but in some facilities the track is combined in an enclosed area used for sports requiring an ice rink or the rink itself is used. Alternatively, ice cross downhill uses a track with various levels of elevation and a combination of bends. Long distance skating ( "marathon skating") such as tour skating is only performed outdoors and uses the available natural ice from frozen lakes, ponds, and marshes. Tour skating at times includes speed skaters, though tour skates are more common.

Common individual sports include cross-country skiing, alpine skiing, snowboarding, ski jumping, speed skating, figure skating, luge, skeleton, bobsleigh, ski orienteering and snowmobiling. 

Common team sports include ice hockey, ringette, broomball (on either an indoor ice rink, or an outdoor ice rink or field of snow), curling, rinkball, and bandy. Based on the number of participants, ice hockey is the world's most popular winter team sport, followed by bandy.

Winter sports at times have their own multi-sport events, such as the Winter Olympic Games and the Winter Universiade.

History
In the early days of the Olympics there was not much differentiation between the summer and winter games. These confusions would span from around the late 1890s until the early to mid 1900s. During this time, some sports considered to be winter sports and played or performed during the Olympic Winter Games today, would be held during the Olympic Summer Games. It was originally wanted to keep all of the Olympic sports together under one event and program, but due to environmental demands of some sports, it had to be separated. 

Snow and ice during the winter time has enabled sliding as a means of transportation, using sledges, skis and skates. This also led to different pastimes and sports being developed in the winter season as compared to other times of the year. Naturally, winter sports are more popular in countries with longer winter seasons.

In the European Alps, St. Moritz became a popular winter resort in 1864.

While most winter sports are played outside, ice hockey, speed skating and to some extent bandy have moved indoors starting in the mid-20th century. Indoor ice rinks with artificial ice allow ice skating and hockey to be played in hot climates.

Outdoor winter sports will likely be severely impacted because of climate change in the next century.

List of winter sports
Note: the Olympic rings next to a sport indicates that this particular sport is included in the Winter Olympic Games, as of the 2014 Winter Olympics in Sochi. The Paralympic logo indicates the same for a sport not in the Olympics but in the Winter Paralympic Games.

Ice skating
 Figure skating 
 Short-track speed skating 
 Speed skating

Skiing

 Acroski (no longer part of the Winter Olympics) 
 Alpine skiing 
 Biathlon 
 Cross-country skiing 
 Downhill skiing
 Freestyle skiing 
 Jack Jumping
 Kite skiing
 Mogul skiing 
 Monoskiing
 Newschool skiing
 Nordic combined 
 Ski archery
 Skiboarding
 Skibob
 Skijoring
 Ski jumping 
 Ski mountaineering 
 Ski orienteering 
 Snowkiting
 Speed skiing
 Speed riding
 Telemark skiing
 Winter pentathlon
 Ski-BASE Jumping

Sledding

Sports that use sleds going down ice tracks or pulled by something:
 Bobsled 
 Dogsled racing
 Ice blocking
 Luge 
 Skeleton 
 Wok racing

Snowboarding
 Alpine snowboarding 
 Boardercross 
 Slalom 
 Snowskating
 Slopestyle

Snowmobiling

 Free style
 Snocross
 Recreation
 Cross-country
 Hill climbing

Team sports

 Bandy
 Broomball
 Curling 
 Ice hockey 
 Ice sledge hockey 
 Ice stock sport
 Military patrol
 Moscow broomball
 Para ice hockey
 Ringette
 Rinkball
 Rink bandy
 Snow rugby
 Snow snake
 Snow volleyball
 Spongee  Sponge hockey
 Synchronized skating
 Yukigassen (competitive snowball fight)

Other sports
 Cold-weather biking
 Barrel jumping - (discipline of speed skating)
 Ice canoeing
 Ice climbing
 Ice cricket
 Ice cross downhill
 Ice racing
 Ice speedway
 Snowbiking
 Tour skating
 Snow drifting
 Snow golf (not to be confused with Crackgar, indigenous Kalash snow golf)

Recreational sports

Some sports are competed in (or simply enjoyed) on a more casual basis, often by children:
 Crackgar (indigenous Kalash snow golf)
 Ice boating or ice sailing
 Ice fishing
 SheenAab Jung (Jammu and Kashmir Snow Fighting)
 Tobogganing
 Snow bowling

Notable winter sporting events

 Winter Olympic Games
 Nordic Games
 World Cup
 Arctic Winter Games
 Asian Winter Games
 Winter Paralympic Games
 Winter Universiade
 Winter Dew Tour
 Winter X Games
 Winter X Games Europe

World Cup
 Bandy World Cup
 Biathlon World Cup
 Bobsleigh World Cup
 FIS Alpine Ski World Cup
 FIS Cross-Country World Cup
 FIS Freestyle Skiing World Cup
 FIS Nordic Combined World Cup
 FIS Ski Jumping World Cup
 FIS Snowboard World Cup
 Luge World Cup
 Short Track Speed Skating World Cup
 Skeleton World Cup (toboggan)
 Speed Skating World Cup
 World Cup in Ski Orienteering

World championships
 Ice Hockey World Championships
 Curling World Championships
 Bandy World Championships
 Biathlon World Championships
 Bobsleigh World Championships
 FIS Alpine World Ski Championships
 FIS Freestyle World Ski Championships
 FIS Nordic World Ski Championships (cross-country skiing, ski jumping, and nordic combined)
 FIS Snowboarding World Championships
 FIL World Luge Artificial Track Championships
 FIL World Luge Natural Track Championships
 FIS Ski Flying World Championships
 World Figure Skating Championships
 World Ringette Championships
 World Long Track Speed Skating Championships
 World Short Track Speed Skating Championships
 Skeleton World Championships (toboggan)
 World Ski Orienteering Championships

See also
 Winter carnival
 Outline of sports
 Outdoor activity

References

Citations

Sources 

 Syers, Edgar; Syers, Madge (eds.) (1908) The Book of Winter Sports London: Edward Arnold  
 Dier, J. C. (ed.) (1912) The Book of Winter Sports, an attempt to catch the spirit of the keen joys of the winter season The Macmillan Company
 Jessup, Elon Huntington (1923) Snow and ice sports: a winter manual E. P. Dutton & Co.
 Cereghini, Mario (1955) Five Thousand Years of Winter Sports Edizioni del Milione
 Liebers, Arthur (1971) The Complete Book of Winter Sports NY: Coward, McCann & Geoghegan

External links

 
 

 
Sports by type